Brian Athol Jordan (31 January 1932 – 27 December 2018) was an English professional footballer who played as a half-back in the Football League for Rotherham United, Middlesbrough and York City, in non-League football for Denaby United, and was on the books of Derby County without making a league appearance.

He died in 2018.

References

1932 births
2018 deaths
Footballers from Doncaster
English footballers
Association football midfielders
Derby County F.C. players
Denaby United F.C. players
Rotherham United F.C. players
Middlesbrough F.C. players
York City F.C. players
English Football League players